Chryseofusus bradneri is a species of sea snail, a marine gastropod mollusk in the family Fasciolariidae, the spindle snails, the tulip snails and their allies.

Description
The length of the shell attains 53.9 mm.

Distribution
This species occurs in the Indian Ocean off Réunion.

References

 Drivas J. & Jay M. (1990). Descriptions of new mollusks from Réunion Island -II. Cerithidae, Lamellariidae, Buccinidae, Mitridae, and Veneridae. Venus. 49(4): 271-279.

External links
 

Fasciolariidae
Gastropods described in 1990